Bertram John Woodall (born 16 January 1949), more commonly known as John Woodall, is an English former footballer.

Career

Woodall was playing for Goole Town before joining York City in February 1967 as a part-timer to provide cover for Ted MacDougall, after being spotted by former Goole manager George Teasdale. He made two appearances for the side before moving onto Selby Town in May 1968, where he played until 1969 when he rejoined Goole. He then played at Gainsborough Trinity before returning to the Football League with Rotherham United in March 1974. He made 26 appearances and scored six goals in the league whilst at the club, after which he joined Scarborough in March 1975. He played in three FA Trophy finals for Scarborough, in 1975, 1976, when he scored in the 3–2 win over Stafford Rangers and 1977. He finished as the club's top scorer in two consecutive seasons; 1975–76 (30 goals) and 1976–77 (24 goals). He later rejoined Selby and then returned to Goole in 1981. He went on to finish his career with a return to Gainsborough.

He won the Player of the year award in 1976, whilst playing for Scarborough.

Notes

1949 births
Living people
People from Goole
Footballers from the East Riding of Yorkshire
English footballers
Association football forwards
Goole Town F.C. players
York City F.C. players
Selby Town F.C. players
Gainsborough Trinity F.C. players
Rotherham United F.C. players
Scarborough F.C. players
English Football League players